Kuaitiao khua kai is a popular Chinese-influenced Thai dish made with stir-fried rice noodles and chicken. The recipe for kuaitiao was later changed by Thais to dried noodles with chicken, whence came its modern Thai name.

Kuaitiao khua kai is normally served as soaked dried rice noodles stirred with a simple combination of ingredients, such as chicken, squid, and lettuce. Other optional ingredients include sliced tomatoes, eggs, deep-fried doughsticks, garlic, and spring onion. It is seasoned with oyster sauce, light soy sauce, and fish sauce. It also may be seasoned with sauce prik, chili flakes, vinegar, sugar, and tangy tomato sauce. A special way to make kuaitiao khua kai is to spread it on top of lettuce.

It is said that Kuaitiao khua kai originated from chicken congee without stock in the Talat Noi neighborhood in the before World War II period by overseas Chinese, who migrated to sell. It is very popular, especially young women, so it was adapted into noodles.

The notable Kuaitiao khua kai eateries in Bangkok are Suan Mali neighborhood near Hua Lamphong railway station, and Phlapphla Chai neighborhood near Bangkok Metropolitan Administration General Hospital in the Yaowarat (Bangkok Chinatown) area. In another places such Ban Poon neighborhood in Bang Plad under the Rama VIII bridge in Thonburi side and Luk Luang road along the Khlong Phadung Krung Kasem near Talat Nang Loeng and the Government House etc.

References 

Thai noodle dishes
Fried noodles